Henrik Leek (born 15 March 1990) is a Swedish curler. He competed at the 2015 Ford World Men's Curling Championship in Halifax, Nova Scotia, Canada, as alternate for the Swedish national curling team.

He won a gold medal with the Swedish team at the 2011 World Junior Curling Championships, and a gold medal at the 2014 European Curling Championships.

Personal life
Leek works as a project leader.

References

External links
 

1990 births
Living people
Swedish male curlers
World curling champions
European curling champions
Swedish curling champions
Sportspeople from Stockholm
People from Härnösand
Curlers at the 2018 Winter Olympics
Olympic curlers of Sweden
Olympic silver medalists for Sweden
Medalists at the 2018 Winter Olympics
Olympic medalists in curling
21st-century Swedish people